The Robert Award for Best Visual Effects is one of the merit awards presented by the Danish Film Academy at the annual Robert Awards ceremony. The award has been handed out since 1984, although numerous years in the 1980s and 1990s saw no honorees. Between 1984 and 2013 the award was given as the Robert Award for Best Special Effects (Robert Prisen for årets special effects), and since 2014 as the Robert Award for Best Visual Effects (Robert Prisen for årets visuelle effekter).

Honorees

1980s 
 1984: Eg Norre – 
 1985:  – The Element of Crime
 1986: Peter Høimark and  – 
 1987: Stig Sparre-Ulrich and Niels Arnt Torp – Barndommens gade
 1988: Not awarded
 1989: Not awarded

1990s 
 1990: Not awarded
 1991: Not awarded
 1992: Hummer Højmark, Morten Jacobsen and Kaj Grönberg – Europa
 1993: Not awarded
 1994: Not awarded
 1995: Not awarded
 1996: Not awarded
 1997: Not awarded
 1998: Not awarded
 1999: Hans Peter Ludvigsen –

2000s 
 2000: Hummer Højmark – I Kina spiser de hunde
 2001: Thomas Borch Nielsen – 
 2002: Hummer Højmark, Steen Lyders, and Kris Kolodziejski – 
 2003: Jonas Wagner, Morten Lynge, Niels Valentin Dal and Hummer Højmark – Klatretøsen
 2004: Peter Hjorth – It's All About Love
 2005: Daniel Silwerfeldt and Thomas Borch Nielsen – 
 2006: Peter Hjort, Hummer Højmark, and Lars K. Andersen – Adam's Apples
 2007: Thomas Dyg – Tempelriddernes skat
 2008: Hummer Højmark and Jeppe Nygaard Christensen – Island of Lost Souls
 2009: Hummer Højmark, Jonas Drehn, and Thomas Busk – Flammen og Citronen

2010s 
 2010: Peter Hjorth and Ota Bares – Antichrist
 2011: Morten Jacobsen and Thomas Foldberg – R
 2012: Hummer Højmark and Peter Hjort – Melancholia
 2013: Jeppe Nygaard Christensen, Esben Syberg, and Rikke Hovgaard Jørgensen – En kongelig affære
 2014: Hummer Højmark, Rikke Gjerløv Hansen, Thomas Øhlenschlæger, and Jeppe Nygaard Christensen – 
 2015: Peter Hjorth – Nymphomaniac Director's Cut

References

External links 
  

1984 establishments in Denmark
Awards established in 1984
Film awards for Best Visual Effects
Visual Effects